Esteban Villegas Villarreal (born 22 February 1976) is a Mexican surgeon, singer and politician affiliated with the Institutional Revolutionary Party and the current Governor of Durango. He previously served as the mayor of Durango City, the health secretary of the state, and as a deputy for the congress of the state. As a singer, he is a member of the Regional Mexican music duo Esteban y Lauro.

References

1976 births
Living people
21st-century Mexican politicians
Institutional Revolutionary Party politicians
Governors of Durango
Members of the Chamber of Deputies (Mexico)
Mexican surgeons
Politicians from Durango
Regional Mexican musicians